The wharf borer, Nacerdes melanura, belongs to the insect order Coleoptera, the beetles. They belong to the family Oedemeridae, which are commonly known as false blister beetles. Wharf borers are present in all the states of the USA except for Florida. It takes about a year to develop from an egg to an adult. The insect is called the 'wharf borer' because the larval stage of this insect is often found on pilings and timbers of wharves, especially along coastal areas. The adult beetles can be identified via a black band across the end of both elytra, or wing covers. In addition, wharf borers can be distinguished from other members of the family Oedemeridae via the presence of a single spur on the tibia of the forelegs, and the distance between both eyes (twice the length of one eye). Eggs are oviposited on rotten wood where larvae hatch and burrow to feed on rotten wood. Adults do not feed and depend on stored energy reserves accumulated during the larval stage. They are considered to be a pest because they damage wood used in building infrastructures.

Identification
The female of this beetle will lay eggs in any damp, decaying timber, which has been attacked by fungus. The eggs are creamy white in colour, slightly curved with tapered ends. The larvae, also creamy white, is equipped with brown mandibles, ready to bore into the timber and feed on the wood. The adult insects are around 10–12 mm in length, yellowish to reddish orange in colour, with a long slender body and antennae half of its body length. The adult beetles can emerge from under the floor of buildings in quite large numbers, causing the occupants to think they may be being invaded by cockroaches. The beetles themselves are quite harmless. They may be distinguished from cockroaches by the black band across the end of both elytra. Another distinguishing feature is the three raised longitudinal lines on each wing case - a feature common to all beetles in the family Oedemeridae. There are only seven species of this family in the UK. In general, in size and form they resemble Soldier Beetles found on flowers.

Natural history

Distribution and habitat
This is a cosmopolitan species. They can be found anywhere where there is moist and decaying wood, such as wharf timbers that are regularly submerged by a tidal flow river, for example near the River Thames. A survey by Pitman et al. (2003) revealed the wharf borer to be widespread in temperate countries. There were samples recorded in Australia, New Zealand, Japan, France, Denmark and Canada. Pitman et al. (2003) further noted that wharf borers are widespread in the UK and Wales, with a few records in Scotland, but neither adults nor larvae were found in Ireland. This beetle is thought to be a native of the Great Lakes region of North America and has been reported to cause much damage to dock timber in this region. However, others believed that they were introduced to the New World from Europe by the lumber trade or by driftwood. There is still uncertainty in the scientific literature about the origin of the wharf borer.

Wharf borer adults may be present in different types of habitats but larvae are almost always restricted to damp, rotten wood. Buried pieces of wood may also harbor the insects. It was said that there was an increase in numbers of this insect in London following the Second World War, when masses of timber became buried under the ground following bomb blasts. They were found beneath the floor of gasoline stations, apartments, and even telegraph poles.

Life cycle
Like all beetles, the wharf borer undergoes complete metamorphosis. The development time from egg to adult is about 12 months, and adults tend to emerge around June to late August in the U.K. Eggs are deposited on wood surfaces where they are subjected to temperature extremes. Egg longevity is reported to be 5–11 days. First instar larvae burrow about 1 cm beneath the surface of the wood after hatching, where soft-rot type degradation is evident. The larval stage is reported to last from up to 2 months to 2 years, during which time larvae digest cellulose and hemicellulose. Larvae produce the enzyme cellulase, which enables them to feed on rooting wood, similar to many wood-boring Coleopterans. Tunnels formed by larvae during burrowing through the wood can be 30 cm long . A certain head capsule size must be attained for larvae to pupate, which takes about 8.5 months to attain.
The cream white Pupae are reported to last 6–17 days, the exact amount of time being influenced by temperature and relative humidity. At the onset of pupation, the abdomen is reduced and the head loses its prognathous form. After 3 days, the eyes start to be pigmented, followed by the mandibles at six days and the elytra at nine days. Pupae are capable of moving the abdomen from side to side. Adults are short-lived, non-feeding, free-living, able to fly, and can locate wood via olfactory cues. They emerge from the resting pupal stage between May and September, though are more often observed in June. Adults live for about 2–10 days under laboratory conditions, during which time they mate and lay eggs. Females are not substrate specific when choosing an oviposition site. Wharf borers are known to infest both hardwood and softwood.

Temperature- and relative humidity-dependent development
Temperature influences development of eggs, and eggs only develop within the range 20-30 °C. The upper temperature limit for eggs to hatch is approximately 30-35 °C. This may explain the absence of the wharf borer in tropical climates. Relative humidity also influences egg development, with the lower threshold being 20-40%. Females lay eggs at temperatures that are suitable for egg development. Temperature is the most important factor that influences the development of the larva and the pupa. Relative humidity and photoperiods do not adversely affect development.  It is important to note that winter does not induce the larvae to pupate. In fact, lower temperatures increase the time for the larvae to attain the required head capsule size for pupation by virtue of a reduced metabolic rate. Adults emerge from the pupal stage at almost all relative humidities. This indicates that the pupal stage is more resistant to desiccation than eggs because, as eggs do not develop at relative humidities lower than 20% . Pupae are reported not to develop below 10 °C, or above 30 °C. At higher temperatures, adult longevity is greatly reduced. This is because insect activity increases, and therefore speeds up usage of stored energy reserves. Lower relative humidity also decreases longevity due to increased desiccation, especially with  non-feeding adults and those without an external supply of water.

Human Impact
The wharf borer’s name is of importance to fisherman, sailors, and quarrymen who work along coastal areas. Damage done to old ships and docks by the wharf borer is a good indication of how old the vessels are as the beetles only attack old timber. The presence of wharf borers and the simultaneous destruction can be accepted as a safety precaution to repair docks and ships to avoid dangerous accidents. It is known as a secondary pest, because the larva mainly feed on damp and decaying wood found along waterways and coastlines. The network of tunnels form when wharf borer larvae burrow and ingest the rotten wood, weakening the mechanical support given by the wood. This leads to increased damages in plumbing and rotting timbers. Oak, poplar, and pine are some of the timbers attacked by the wharf borer, indicating its development in both soft and hard woods. It is best to correct the wood moisture problems and remove the source of infected decaying wood. The  beetles, generally only a nuisance between June to August, can be controlled by the application of a residual insecticide (such as permethrin). This can be applied to the wall and floor junctions of dwellings and offices. These adults can also be simply vacuumed or picked up and discarded. The larvae is found to be a pest of telegraph poles and fences where dogs have urinated. In Toronto, a large number of adults were discovered in a newspaper office, especially attracted to toilets. In America, Drooz (1953) reported that the insect was responsible for very costly damage to foundations underneath buildings in Milwaukee, Wisconsin.To protect stored archaeological timbers from the damaging effects of wharf borers, a procedure has been developed to control the attacks. The first measure calls for checking the particular area for infestation by the insects. Next, the extent of infestation in the stored timbers is determined. Once the degree of damage has been recorded, the timbers need to be isolated and quarantined. The storage area and the infected timbers are subjected to an appropriate treatment system which is compatible with future conservation treatment systems.

References

James R. Busvine - Insects & Hygiene third Edition 1980
A.R. Brookes BSc (Biol), FRES - Observation while working in pest control industry
The Woodworm Problem by Norman E. Hicken, Second edition, 1972
Handbook of Pest Control edited by Arnold Mallis, Sixth Edition, 1982

Oedemeridae
Cosmopolitan arthropods
Beetles described in 1758